The 47th Academy Awards were presented Tuesday, April 8, 1975, at the Dorothy Chandler Pavilion in Los Angeles, California, honoring the best films of 1974. The ceremonies were presided over by Bob Hope, Shirley MacLaine, Sammy Davis Jr., and Frank Sinatra. This was the last year NBC aired the ceremonies before ABC secured broadcasting rights, which they still hold to this day.

The success of The Godfather Part II was notable; it received twice as many Oscars as its predecessor (six) and duplicated its feat of three Best Supporting Actor nominations (as of the 93rd Academy Awards, the last film to receive three nominations in a single acting category). Between the two of them, father and son Carmine and Francis Ford Coppola won four awards, with Carmine winning for Best Original Dramatic Score (with Nino Rota) and Francis for Picture, Director, and Best Screenplay Adapted from Other Material (with Mario Puzo).

This was the only Oscars where all nominees in one category (where the category had five nominees) were released by the same studio: all five Best Costume Design nominations were for films released by Paramount Pictures.

Winners and nominees

Nominees were announced on February 24, 1975. Winners are listed first, highlighted in boldface and indicated with a double dagger.

Special Achievement Award
  Frank Brendel, Glen Robinson, and Albert Whitlock for the visual effects of Earthquake

Academy Honorary Award
 Jean Renoir
 Howard Hawks

Jean Hersholt Humanitarian Award
 Arthur B. Krim

Multiple nominations and awards

These films had multiple nominations:
11 nominations: Chinatown and The Godfather Part II
8 nominations: The Towering Inferno
6 nominations: Lenny and Murder on the Orient Express
4 nominations: Earthquake
3 nominations: Alice Doesn't Live Here Anymore, Blazing Saddles, The Conversation and Day for Night
2 nominations: The Great Gatsby, Harry and Tonto, The Little Prince, A Woman Under the Influence and Young Frankenstein

The following films received multiple awards.
6 wins: The Godfather Part II
3 wins: The Towering Inferno
2 wins: The Great Gatsby

Presenters and performers
The following individuals, listed in order of appearance, presented awards or performed musical numbers.

Presenters

Performers

See also
 32nd Golden Globe Awards
 1974 in film
 17th Grammy Awards
 26th Primetime Emmy Awards
 27th Primetime Emmy Awards
 28th British Academy Film Awards
 29th Tony Awards

References

Academy Awards ceremonies
1974 film awards
1975 in Los Angeles
1975 in American cinema
April 1975 events in the United States
Academy
Television shows directed by Marty Pasetta